Black Duck (also known as Black Duck Siding) is a local service district and designated place in the Canadian province of Newfoundland and Labrador that is 15 km (9 mi) east of the town of Stephenville. It is characterized by Harry's River, which runs past the community and is an Atlantic salmon fishing river.

Black Duck is known as the retirement place of Captain Victor Campbell RN, the Antarctic explorer who established a community of expats there in the 1920s.

Geography 
Black Duck is in Newfoundland and straddles the boundary Subdivision C and Subdivision D, both within Division No. 4.

Demographics 

Government 
Black Duck is a local service district (LSD) that is governed by a committee responsible for the provision of certain services to the community. The chair of the LSD committee is Sean Martin.

See also 
List of communities in Newfoundland and Labrador
List of designated places in Newfoundland and Labrador
List of local service districts in Newfoundland and Labrador

References 

Designated places in Newfoundland and Labrador
Local service districts in Newfoundland and Labrador